Edward Albright (August 18, 1873 - 1937, Nashville, Tennessee) was a non-career appointee who served as the United States Minister to Finland (1933-1937). In 1937, he took the oath of office to become United States Minister to Costa Rica, but he died in the United States before proceeding to the post.

Albright graduated from Cumberland University in 1898. Before becoming a diplomat, he was a lawyer in Gallatin, Tennessee, and served as owner and editor of Sumner County News beginning in 1907.

References

1873 births
1937 deaths
Date of death missing
Place of birth missing
Ambassadors of the United States to Costa Rica
Ambassadors of the United States to Finland
Cumberland University alumni
People from Nashville, Tennessee
Tennessee lawyers
20th-century American newspaper editors
Editors of Tennessee newspapers